The National Astronomy Meeting (NAM) is an annual scientific conference of astronomers, usually held in the British Isles. It is sponsored and coordinated by the Royal Astronomical Society (RAS), and functions as the primary annual meeting of the society. NAM is one of the largest professional astronomy conferences in Europe, with typically around 600 delegates attending.

Each NAM includes a variety of plenary and parallel sessions discussing the latest research in astronomy (and related fields), public lectures, community sessions and a press office to promote the results presented at the meeting to journalists and the public.

The meetings began when the RAS decided to hold some of its scientific meetings outside London, where the society is based. Known as the 'out of town' meetings, the first was held in 1948. The meetings ran in most years until 1966, when they were discontinued.

The RAS resumed the series in 1976. An expanded format was adopted from 1992 onwards; to reflect this broader remit the name was changed to the 'National Astronomy Meeting'. Since 1976 the meeting has been held every year, except in 2000 when the General Assembly of the International Astronomical Union was held in the UK instead, and 2020 due to the COVID-19 pandemic in the United Kingdom.

History 
The Royal Astronomical Society (RAS) was formed in 1820, and from the very beginning, one of its major activities was to host scientific meetings. Typically eight meetings each year were held at its headquarters in London (a practice which continues today). The growth of astronomical research throughout the UK and the concurrent increase in the number of RAS Fellows beyond the London area led to increased demand for meetings outside the capital. Although occasional meetings were held in other locations to mark special events, the RAS did not institute a regular programme of meetings outside London until after the major disruption to RAS activities caused by the Second World War.

The solution was to move one of the society's meetings outside London each year, terming them 'out of town' meetings. The first of these was held in Edinburgh in 1948. The society was reluctant to move any of the regular eight meetings, which ran from October to May, so the 'out of town' meeting was held as an additional ninth meeting during the summer break in the academic year. They were held in the summer or early autumn in most years until 1966 when the RAS Council decided to stop asking groups to host them. The subsequent lack of meetings outside London was unpopular with Fellows, so the 'out of town' meetings were reintroduced in 1976, but moved to April. They replaced the usual monthly RAS meeting for that month and were usually held during universities' Easter holidays.

There was no set format to the out of town meetings, which were originally held over a single day, but during the 1960s some lasted three days. They were often limited in topical scope. Ken Pounds, the President of the RAS from 1990-2, proposed expanding their remit into a more general meeting, inspired by the large meetings of the British Association and the American Astronomical Society. The goal was to attract a broad section of the UK astronomy research community and provide a focus for media attention on the discipline. To reflect this newly expanded format, the series was re-named the 'National Astronomy Meeting' (NAM) from 1992 onwards.

The meetings continued to be held around Easter until 2012, except in 1999 when NAM moved to August to coincide with the 1999 solar eclipse, visible from the venue. From 2013 onwards NAM has been held in late June or early July, during universities' summer holidays. Since 1994, each meeting has lasted four or five days. There was no NAM in the year 2000 because the much larger General Assembly of the International Astronomical Union was being held in Manchester and thus was the major UK astronomy meeting of that year.

Format 
Each NAM lasts four or five days and normally includes:
 Plenary talks every day on topics of broad interest to astronomy.
 Parallel sessions on specialised areas of research every day, with several running concurrently. Fellows of the RAS can propose topics for the sessions held at each meeting, in exchange for the proposer organising and chairing the session.
 The annual meetings of the UK Solar Physics (UKSP) and Magnetosphere Ionosphere and Solar-Terrestrial physics group (MIST), usually running as parallel sessions.
 A 'town hall meeting' to discuss science policy and funding issues with the Royal Astronomical Society, Science and Technology Facilities Council and the UK Space Agency.
 Public lectures aimed at local members of the public.
 Presentations of the annual awards of the Royal Astronomical Society.
 A 'teachers day' for school and/or university educators.
 Various community discussion sessions or networking lunches on topics such as careers, diversity etc.
 A social programme for delegates, including a formal conference dinner and a five-a-side football tournament.
 A press office and media relations team for journalists.

Meetings are usually held in a UK university or research institute active in astronomy, who organise and host the meeting. The RAS provides financial sponsorship, advertising, media relations etc. and run some sessions within the meeting. Universities see hosting the meeting as an opportunity to promote their astronomical research and attract undergraduate students in the discipline. However in some recent years (e.g. 2011, 2015) the RAS has taken on the full organisation of the whole meeting itself, which is then held at a conference centre rather than a university.

The meetings are open to anyone who pays the registration fee; although membership of the RAS is not required, Fellows of the RAS do receive a reduced price. Most attendees are professional research astronomers or postgraduate students, but interested amateur astronomers, undergraduates, school teachers, journalists etc. are also welcome. Typically there are around 500-600 registered attendees, but the 2009 event (which was combined with the annual meeting of the European Astronomical Society) drew a record of 1100 delegates.

Meetings

See also 
 General Assembly of the International Astronomical Union

Notes & references

Notes

References

Astronomy conferences
Royal Astronomical Society
Science events in the United Kingdom